Goodman Brothers and Hinlein Company is a historic factory building located at 1238 Callowhill Street in the Callowhill neighborhood of Philadelphia, Pennsylvania.  It was built in 1909, and is an eight-story, nine bay reinforced concrete building with brick facing. It has housed a dress trimmings company, lithographic printing company, and a warehouse.

It was added to the National Register of Historic Places in 1985. It is a contributing property to the Callowhill Industrial Historic District.

Currently known as Beaux Arts Lofts, 1238 Callowhill Street also has the distinction of being the first building in this old industrial zone to become a residential living space, and in 1995 to be converted into a condominium, once again setting the pace for what was to become "The Loft District."

References

Industrial buildings and structures on the National Register of Historic Places in Philadelphia
Industrial buildings completed in 1909
Historic district contributing properties in Pennsylvania
Callowhill, Philadelphia
1909 establishments in Pennsylvania
Textile mills in the United States